The Black Peaks Formation is a geological formation in Texas whose strata date back to the Late Cretaceous. Dinosaur remains (from the sauropod Alamosaurus) and the pterosaur Quetzalcoatlus northropi have been among the fossils reported from the formation. The boundary with the underlying Javelina Formation has been estimated at about 66.5 million years old. The formation preserves the rays Rhombodus and Dasyatis, as well as many gar scales.

See also 
 List of dinosaur-bearing rock formations
 List of pterosaur-bearing stratigraphic units

References

Further reading 
  J. A. Fronimos and T. M. Lehman. 2014. New specimens of a titanosaur sauropod from the Maastrichtian of Big Bend National Park, Texas. Journal of Vertebrate Paleontology 34(4):883-899
 T. M. Lehman and K. Barnes. 2010. Champsosaurus (Diapsida: Choristodera) from the Paleocene of West Texas: Paleoclimatic Implications. Journal of Paleontology 84(2):341-345
 J. A. Schiebout. 1974. Vertebrate paleontology and paleoecology of Paleocene Black Peaks Formation, Big Bend National Park, Texas. Texas Memorial Museum Bulletin 24:1-88
 J. A. Wilson. 1967. Early Tertiary mammals. In R. A. Maxwell, J. T. Lonsdale, R. T. Hazzard, & J. A. Wilson (eds.), Geology of Big Bend National Park, Brewster County, Texas. The University of Texas Publication 6711:157-169

Geologic formations of Texas
Maastrichtian Stage of North America
Cretaceous–Paleogene boundary
Paleocene Series of North America
Danian Stage
Mudstone formations
Limestone formations
Fluvial deposits
Lacustrine deposits
Paleontology in Texas